KCHI-FM (102.5 FM) is a radio station broadcasting a classic hits format. It is licensed to Chillicothe, Missouri, United States.  The station is currently owned by Leatherman Communications and features programming from Citadel Broadcasting.

History
On May 9, 2007, the station was sold to Leatherman Communications.

On September 13, 2013, KCHI-FM moved up the FM dial to 102.5 FM. While broadcasting on 98.5 FM, the station went off the air for a few hours to upgrade equipment during the morning. When KCHI-FM returned to the air that afternoon, they then began broadcasting on 102.5 FM. The station was licensed to operate on 102.5 FM on November 21, 2013.

Previous logo
  (KCHI-FM's logo under previous 98.5 FM frequency)

References

External links

Classic hits radio stations in the United States
CHI-FM
Radio stations established in 1986
1976 establishments in Missouri